Aspidistra grandiflora is a species of flowering plant. A. grandiflora grows in Vietnam in dry broad-leaved lowland forests on karstic limestone outcrops with fissures.

Description
This species is a perennial herb. Its rhizome is creeping.

Distribution
Aspidistra grandiflora is known only from its type locality, in Mai Châu District, Hòa Bình Province, Vietnam.

References

Further reading
Gao, Qi, and Yan Liu. "Karyomorphology of Aspidistra grandiflora HJ Tillich from Indonesia." The Nucleus 55.3 (2012): 139–141.
Meng, Tao, and Qi Gao. "Karyomorphology of six species of the genus Aspidistra Ker-Gawl.(Fam. Asparagaceae sl) from China." The Nucleus 57.2 (2014): 143–147.
Tillich, H‐J. "An updated and improved determination key for Aspidistra Ker‐Gawl.(Ruscaceae, Monocotyledons)." Feddes Repertorium 119.5‐6 (2008): 449–462.
Tillich, Hans-Juergen. "The genus Aspidistra Ker-Gawl.(Asparagaceae) in Vietnam." Taiwania 59.1 (2014): 1–8.

External links

grandiflora
Flora of Vietnam
Plants described in 2007